Mihail Alexandrov (born April 9, 1985) is an Olympic swimmer from Bulgaria. He swam for Bulgaria at the 2004 and 2008 Olympics. Alexandrov has been swimming for the USA since 2009.

Alexandrov, who has dual Bulgarian/USA citizenship, swam for the USA's Northwestern University from 2003 to 2007,. In March 2007 he set a USA National Record in the 100 yard breaststroke (51.56) at the NCAA Division I Swimming and Diving Championships, while swimming for Northwestern. This was despite the fact that he had not swum internationally for the US at that time and that he was viewed as a Bulgarian swimmer. The USA Swimming rules at the time allowed for the USA National mark to be set by a swimmer who could represent the US in international competition (his dual citizenship allowed for this) and who at the time of the swim was not representing another country (he was swimming for the country-neutral Northwestern University at the time of the swim). USA Swimming's rules have subsequently been altered so that only swimmers currently representing the USA internationally can set the "American" Record. Alexandrov's record was broken in 2012 by Kevin Cordes.

Alexandrov now works as a personal trainer in the Los Angeles area where he also coaches swimming.

References

External Links

1985 births
Living people
Bulgarian male swimmers
Bulgarian emigrants to the United States
American male breaststroke swimmers
Northwestern Wildcats men's swimmers
Olympic swimmers of Bulgaria
Swimmers at the 2004 Summer Olympics
Swimmers at the 2008 Summer Olympics
Sportspeople from Sofia
Medalists at the FINA World Swimming Championships (25 m)
Doping cases in swimming
Universiade medalists in swimming
Universiade silver medalists for the United States
Universiade bronze medalists for the United States
Medalists at the 2013 Summer Universiade
 Northwestern University alumni